Patrick Forde (22 July 1922 – 13 May 1972) was an Irish Fianna Fáil politician. Forde stood unsuccessfully for election at the 1965 general election. He was elected to Dáil Éireann as a Fianna Fáil Teachta Dála (TD) at the 1969 general election for the Cork Mid constituency. He died in 1972 during the 19th Dáil, a by-election was held on 2 August 1972 which was won by Gene Fitzgerald of Fianna Fáil.

References

1922 births
1972 deaths
Fianna Fáil TDs
Members of the 19th Dáil
Politicians from County Cork